Juan Carlos Centeno (born November 16, 1989) is a Puerto Rican professional baseball catcher in the Arizona Diamondbacks organization. He previously played in Major League Baseball (MLB) for the New York Mets, Milwaukee Brewers, Minnesota Twins, Houston Astros, Texas Rangers, and Boston Red Sox.

Career

New York Mets
Centeno was selected in round 32 with the 991st pick of the 2007 MLB draft by the New York Mets. He received a $5,000 signing bonus. He was selected primarily because of his defensive qualities, as his batting capabilities were not the best. Centeno began his professional career in 2007 with the Gulf Coast League Mets at the Rookie League league level

After the 2008 season, he played for Gigantes de Carolina of the Liga de Béisbol Profesional Roberto Clemente(LBPRC).

After the 2012 season, he played for Atenienses de Manatí of the LBPRC.

In 2013, Centeno advanced to the Triple-A level with the Las Vegas 51s. On September 9, 2013, Centeno was called up to the majors for the first time. He made his major league debut on September 18 against the San Francisco Giants, going 2-for-4 with two singles, and his first major league RBI. For the 2013 season, Centeno appeared in four MLB games, batting .300 with one RBI. After the 2013 season, he played for Carolina of the LBPRC.

In 2014, he appeared in 10 MLB games, batting .200 with two RBIs. That season, Centeno also played in 74 minor league games, batting .289 with one home run and 25 RBIs.

After the 2014 season, he played for Senadores de San Juan of the LBPRC.

Milwaukee Brewers
On October 31, 2014, Centeno was selected off waivers by the Milwaukee Brewers.

In 2015, after catcher Jonathan Lucroy was injured, Centeno was called up to Milwaukee. From late April to late May, he appeared in 10 MLB games, batting .048 (1-for-21). He was optioned to the Triple-A Colorado Springs Sky Sox when Lucroy returned. Centeno was granted free agency on November 6, 2015. After the 2015 season, he played for Cangrejeros de Santurce and Criollos de Caguas of the LBPRC.

Minnesota Twins
Centeno signed with the Minnesota Twins on November 30, 2015.

In 2016, He served as the team's regular back-up catcher, appearing in 55 games with 192 plate appearances while batting .261 (46-for-176) with three home runs and 25 RBIs. He again became a free agent on November 23, 2016.
After the 2016 season, he played for Tiburones de Aguadilla of the LBPRC.

Houston Astros
In December 2016, Centeno signed a minor league contract with the Houston Astros.

On May 23, 2017, he appeared in his first game for the Astros, against the Detroit Tigers where he homered in his debut. In 22 games with the Astros in 2017, Centeno finished with a .231 batting average, two home runs, and four RBI. The Astros finished the season with a 101–61 record, and went on to win the World Series for the first time. Centeno was on the Astros' roster through the postseason, but only appeared in one postseason game (Game 3 of the 2017 ALDS) and did not have a plate appearance.

Texas Rangers
Centeno was claimed off waivers on November 27, 2017, by the Texas Rangers.

Early in the 2018 season, he appeared in 10 games with the Rangers, batting .162 (6-for-37) with one home run and three RBIs. He was designated for assignment on May 3, and sent outright to the Triple-A Round Rock Express four days later. He was granted free agency on October 1, 2018.
After the 2018 season, he played for Indios de Mayagüez of the LBPRC.

Boston Red Sox
On November 13, 2018, Centeno signed a minor league deal with the Boston Red Sox; he was assigned to the Triple-A Pawtucket Red Sox.

On September 1, 2019, the Red Sox selected Centeno's contract, adding him to their active MLB roster. He played his first game with the Red Sox on September 11, appearing against the Toronto Blue Jays. Centeno appeared in seven games with the 2019 Red Sox, batting .133 with two RBIs. Following the 2019 season, he was removed from Boston's 40-man roster and elected to become a free agent.
After the 2019 season, he played for Atenienses de Manatí of the LBPRC.

On January 23, 2020, Centeno re-signed with the Red Sox on a minor league deal. He was later announced as a non-roster invitee to Red Sox spring training. He became a minor-league free agent on November 2, 2020.
After the 2020 season, he played for Atenienses of the LBPRC. He has also played for Puerto Rico in the 2021 Caribbean Series.

Detroit Tigers
On April 15, 2021, Centeno signed a minor league contract with the Detroit Tigers organization. Centeno began the 2021 season with the Double-A Erie SeaWolves. After only 5 games, hitting .316 with 1 home run and 4 RBI's, he was promoted to the Triple-A Toledo Mud Hens. Centeno played in 53 games for Triple-A Toledo, hitting .277 with 1 home run and 17 RBI's. He became a free agent following the season.

Arizona Diamondbacks
On January 25, 2022, Centeno signed a minor league contract with the Arizona Diamondbacks.

Personal life
Centeno is married.

See also
 List of Major League Baseball players from Puerto Rico

References

External links

1989 births
Living people
Atenienses de Manatí (baseball) players
Binghamton Mets players
Boston Red Sox players
Brooklyn Cyclones players
Cangrejeros de Santurce (baseball) players
Colorado Springs Sky Sox players
Criollos de Caguas players
Erie SeaWolves players
Fresno Grizzlies players
Gigantes de Carolina players
Gulf Coast Mets players
Houston Astros players
Indios de Mayagüez players
Las Vegas 51s players
Liga de Béisbol Profesional Roberto Clemente catchers
Major League Baseball catchers
Major League Baseball players from Puerto Rico
Milwaukee Brewers players
Minnesota Twins players
New York Mets players
Pawtucket Red Sox players
People from Arecibo, Puerto Rico
Peoria Javelinas players
Rochester Red Wings players
Round Rock Express players
Senadores de San Juan players
St. Lucie Mets players
Texas Rangers players
Tiburones de Aguadilla players
Toledo Mud Hens players
Amarillo Sod Poodles players